Royal Air Force Folkingham or RAF Folkingham is a former Royal Air Force station located south west of Folkingham, Lincolnshire and about  due south of county town Lincoln and  north of London, England.

Opened in 1940, it was used by both the Royal Air Force and United States Army Air Forces.  During the war, it was used primarily as a troop carrier airfield for airborne units and as a subsidiary training depot of the newly formed Royal Air Force Regiment.  After the war, it was placed on care and maintenance during 1947 when the RAF Regiment relocated to RAF Catterick.

During the late 1950s and early 1960s, the RAF Bomber Command used Folkingham as a PGM-17 Thor Intermediate Range Ballistic Missile (IRBM) base.

Today the remains of the airfield are located on private property being used as agricultural fields, with the main north–south runway acting as hardstanding for hundreds of scrapped vehicles.

History

USAAF
Folkingham was known as USAAF Station AAF-484 for security reasons by the USAAF during the war, and by which it was referred to instead of location.  Its USAAF Station Code was "FK".

313th Troop Carrier Group
US personnel started to arrive in January 1944 to prepare for the 313th Troop Carrier Group scheduled to transfer from Trapani/Milo Airfield, Sicily.  On 5 February it opened as a USAAF IX Troop Carrier Command station flying four squadrons of C-47s.  Operational squadrons and fuselage codes were:
 29th Troop Carrier Squadron (Z7)
 47th Troop Carrier Squadron (N3)
 48th Troop Carrier Squadron (5X)
 49th Troop Carrier Squadron (H2)

The 313th TCG was part of the 52nd Troop Carrier Wing.
  
However, at the end of February 1945, the group began its move to a new base in France at Achiet (Advanced Landing Ground B-54), although the last elements did not leave until well into March.

RAF Maintenance Command
Folkingham was retained by the USAAF although most personnel had departed by mid-April. The station was closed in 1947.

British Racing Motors (BRM)
With the facility released from military control, the runway was used by British Racing Motors for development testing of the new BRM 16 cylinder 1.5 litre racing car, which was presented before the press for the first time on 15 December 1949 at Folkingham airfield. A BRM engine test house and other facilities were later built there.

Thor Missile use by RAF Bomber Command
RAF Folkingham later served as a post-war PGM-17 Thor Intermediate Range Ballistic Missile (IRBM) base with 3 IRBM launchers operated by No. 223 (Strategic Missile) Squadron RAF.  With the reactivation of the site in late 1958, BRM was relocated to RAF North Witham.

On the closure of the Thor site, BRM moved back and its later cars were tested at Folkingham, but only remained for a few years. In the late 1960s, the runways and some Nissen huts were used by Lincolnshire Police as a driver training and skid pan area. In the mid-1960s the testing track closed and the airfield was sold off to agricultural interests.

Current use

Today the airfield is largely used by agriculture. Most of the runways and perimeter track were removed after the sale of the airfield by BRM for hardcore aggregate, with some single-lane agricultural roads remaining that generally outlines the former concreted area. No evidence of the technical site located to the north-east of the airfield remains. Evidence of some dispersed personnel sites appear to the north and north-east of the airfield, with some concrete roads now in abandoned, overgrown areas.

The southern half of the airfield partially remains containing several single and double-loop handstands, along with a full-width length of the 00-18 north–south main runway. The runway now serves as a vehicle compound for Nelson M Green & Sons Ltd, for the storage of decommissioned agricultural vehicles, lorries and other equipment. The vehicles, many often rare and long out of production, are stored for the resale of their spare parts. The abandoned hulks also line the sides of the remaining perimeter track along with several of the old dispersal loops.  The wartime bomb dump exists, although it is now a forested area still containing concrete disused bomb stores, evidence of which can be seen by the pattern of vegetation that has overgrown and reclaimed the facility.

The remains of the three post-war Thor missile pads are the most prominent military features remaining on the airfield, their heavily reinforced concrete areas making them difficult and uneconomical to remove for the small amount of aggregate that can be reclaimed from them.

See also

List of former Royal Air Force stations
82d Airborne Division

References

Citations

Bibliography
Bruce Barrymore Halpenny Action Stations: Wartime Military Airfields of Lincolnshire and the East Midlands v. 2
 Freeman, Roger A. (1994) UK Airfields of the Ninth: Then and Now 1994. After the Battle 
 Freeman, Roger A. (1996) The Ninth Air Force in Colour: UK and the Continent-World War Two. After the Battle 
 Maurer, Maurer (1983). Air Force Combat Units Of World War II. Maxwell AFB, Alabama: Office of Air Force History. .
 USAAS-USAAC-USAAF-USAF Aircraft Serial Numbers--1908 to present

External links
Photographs of RAF Folkingham from the Geograph British Isles project

Royal Air Force stations in Lincolnshire
Airfields of the IX Troop Carrier Command in the United Kingdom
Royal Air Force stations of World War II in the United Kingdom
Military units and formations established in 1943
Military units and formations disestablished in 1966
South Kesteven District